Viktor Berg (born October 8, 1977 in Edmonton, Alberta) technically in Estonia and Finland count Viktor Berg de Sangaste, is a Finnish-origin professional male squash player who represented Canada during his career. He reached a career-high world ranking of World No. 44 in June 2003 after having joined the Professional Squash Association in 1996.

His grandfather fled from the early 1940s problems (and coming communist rule) in the Baltic countries, and settled to Canada, where he served in the grain development institute's research. He in his turn was a grandson of the Finnish baroness Maria Bruun and count Fredrik Berg, the famous improver of Baltic agriculture, particularly rye. Ancestors include also baron Theodor Bruun, Minister Secretary of State of the Grand Duchy of Finland.

References
 Suomen Aateliskalenteri - Finlands Adels Kalender, 2007 edition, sub: Berg, counts of Sangaste

External links
 

1977 births
Living people
Canadian male squash players
Pan American Games gold medalists for Canada
Pan American Games medalists in squash
Squash players at the 2003 Pan American Games
Canadian people of Finnish descent
Sportspeople from Edmonton
Medalists at the 2003 Pan American Games